Axis & Allies is a franchise series of World War II strategy board games.

Axis & Allies or Axis and Allies may also refer to:
 Axis & Allies Miniatures
 Axis & Allies: Pacific
 Axis & Allies: Pacific 1940
 Axis & Allies: Europe
 Axis & Allies: Europe 1940
 Axis & Allies: D-Day
 Axis & Allies: Guadalcanal
 Axis & Allies: Battle of the Bulge
 Axis & Allies (1998 video game)
 Axis & Allies (2004 video game)

See also
 :Category:Axis & Allies
 Axis powers of World War II
 Allies of World War II
 Allies of World War I
 Central Powers of World War I